Springfield National Cemetery is a United States National Cemetery located in the city of Springfield, in Greene County, Missouri. Administered by the United States Department of Veterans Affairs, it encompasses , and as of the end of 2005, had 14,685 interments.

History 
Established in 1867 as a place to initially inter Civil War Union soldiers, many of whom died at the Battle of Wilson's Creek. In 1871 a section for Confederate soldiers was added. It has since been expanded and opened to all veterans, and now has the interred remains of soldiers from wars dating back to the Revolutionary War. The cemetery lends its name to National Avenue in Springfield, which formerly passed by the cemetery prior to the southern expansion of the city decades ago.

Notable monuments 
 A marble pillar dedicated to Union General Nathaniel Lyon in 1888.
 A bronze sculpture dedicated to Confederate General Sterling Price in 1901.
 The Battle of Wilson's Creek Memorial.
 A monument dedicated to Pearl Harbor survivors, erected in 1992.
 The Sons and Daughters of the American Revolution Memorial, dedicated to the Continental Army soldiers who died in the Revolutionary War.

Notable interments 
 Medal of Honor recipients
 Sergeant Harrison Collins (1836–1890),  for action in the Civil War
 Corporal Orion P. Howe (1848–1890), for action in the Civil War
 Pharmacist's Mate Chief Petty Officer Fred H. McGuire (1890–1958), for action in the Philippine–American War
 Captain Patrick Pentzer (1838–1901), for action in the Civil War
 Pharmacist's Mate Third Class Jack Williams (1924–1945), for action in World War II
 Others
 Horton Smith (1908–1963), World War II US Army Air Corps captain and professional golfer
 Major General Ralph E. Truman (1880–1962), career Army officer
 Richard Hanson Weightman (1816–1861), Delegate to the US Congress from New Mexico Territory and Civil War Confederate officer
 Various Buffalo Soldiers

References

External links

 National Cemetery Administration
 Springfield National Cemetery
 
 
 

Cemeteries on the National Register of Historic Places in Missouri
Historic American Landscapes Survey in Missouri
United States national cemeteries
Buildings and structures in Springfield, Missouri
Protected areas of Greene County, Missouri
Tourist attractions in Springfield, Missouri
National Register of Historic Places in Greene County, Missouri
1867 establishments in Missouri